High School Musical: The Musical: The Series is an American mockumentary musical drama television series created for Disney+ by Tim Federle, inspired by the High School Musical film series. The series is produced by Chorus Boy and Salty Pictures in association with Disney Channel, with Oliver Goldstick serving as showrunner for the first four episodes. He was succeeded by Federle for the remainder of the first season and thereafter. Set at a fictionalized version of East High School, the school at which the original movie was filmed, the series follows a group of teenage theater enthusiasts who participate in a staging of High School Musical: The Musical as their school production. It also explores their lives as they navigate friendships, love, interests, identity, and family relationships.

Since its debut on Disney Channel, ABC, and Freeform as a preview simulcast on November 8, 2019, High School Musical: The Musical: The Series has released 30 episodes over three seasons. A fourth season is in production. Kabir Akhtar was nominated for a Directors Guild of America Award in 2021 for Outstanding Directorial Achievement in Children's Programs for the episode "Opening Night".

Series overview

Episodes

Season 1 (2019–20)

Season 2 (2021)

Season 3 (2022)

Specials

Notes

References

External links 
 
 

Lists of American comedy-drama television series episodes
2020s television-related lists
2010s television-related lists
Episodes